Peščeni Vrh is a small settlement in the Municipality of Cerkvenjak in northeastern Slovenia. It lies in the Slovene Hills east of Cerkvenjak. The area is part of the traditional region of Styria. The entire municipality is now included in the Drava Statistical Region.

References

External links
Peščeni Vrh on Geopedia

Populated places in the Municipality of Cerkvenjak